Przemyslaw Gawrych is a Poland sprint canoer who competed in the mid-2000s. He won two bronze medals at the ICF Canoe Sprint World Championships (K-4 500 m: 2006, K-4 1000 m: 2005).

References

Living people
Polish male canoeists
Year of birth missing (living people)
Place of birth missing (living people)
ICF Canoe Sprint World Championships medalists in kayak